Stacy Renée Dragila (née Mikaelson; born March 25, 1971) is an American former pole vaulter. She is an Olympic gold medalist and a multiple world champion.

Early life

Dragila was born and raised in Auburn, California, northeast of Sacramento. She also participated in gymnastics, but had to give it up due to childhood asthma.

She attended Placer Union High School where she played volleyball and ran on the track team as a sprinter, hurdler, and jumper. Early on she got coaching from Yuba Community College's John Orognen. She competed in the 300 meters hurdles at the CIF California State Meet, but didn't place.  In 1990, she placed second at the Golden West Invitational in the 400 meters hurdles.

She graduated from Idaho State University in 1995. At ISU, she competed in the heptathlon. She was introduced to pole vaulting by her coach, a former vaulter himself, and she participated in some of the earliest sanctioned women's pole vault competitions.

Pole vaulting career
Dragila won the women's pole vault competition at the 1996 U.S. Olympic Trials. Women's pole vault was a demonstration event at the Trials, and it was not included in the program of the 1996 Olympics in Atlanta.

In March 1997, she won the pole vault competition at the Indoor World Championships and set her first indoor world record, 4.48 m (14 ft 8 in). At the 1999 outdoor World Championships, she again won gold and set her first outdoor world record, 4.60 m (15 ft 1 in). Over the course of her career, she set or tied the indoor world record 8 times and set or tied the outdoor world record 10 times.

After winning the 2000 U.S. Olympic Trials and resetting the world record at 4.63 m (15 ft 2 in), she won the first women's pole vault Olympic gold medal at the 2000 Olympic Games in Sydney.

Dragila made the World Championships in 2009 her final major championship.

While she jumped  at age 37, her  vault at age 38 in 2009 was the ratified W35 Masters World Record until 2017.

In 2014, she was elected into the National Track and Field Hall of Fame.  Dragila Way, on the campus of Idaho State University in Pocatello, is named in her honor.

International competitions

National titles
 USA Outdoor Track and Field Championships
 Pole vault (9): 1996†, 1997, 1999, 2000, 2001, 2002, 2003, 2004, 2005
 USA Indoor Track and Field Championships
 Pole vault (8): 1996, 1997, 1998, 1999, 2000, 2001, 2003, 2004

† The 1996 contest was a non-championship event

Personal
Stacy divorced Brent Dragila in 2006.

She lived in San Diego, California, and is the founder of Altius Track Club.

Stacy now lives in Boise, Idaho, where she owns and coaches at a premier indoor/ outdoor pole vault facility, Dragila Vault Co.

She married American discus thrower Ian Waltz and welcomed daughter Allyx (an alternative spelling of the standard 'Alex') Josephine Waltz on June 21, 2010.

References

External links 

 
 
 
 
 
 
 
 Stacy Dragila Vault Co.

1971 births
Living people
People from Auburn, California
Track and field athletes from California
American female pole vaulters
Olympic gold medalists for the United States in track and field
Athletes (track and field) at the 2000 Summer Olympics
Athletes (track and field) at the 2004 Summer Olympics
Medalists at the 2000 Summer Olympics
World Athletics Championships athletes for the United States
World Athletics Championships medalists
World record setters in athletics (track and field)
Idaho State University alumni
Placer High School alumni
Sportspeople from Greater Sacramento
Goodwill Games medalists in athletics
Track & Field News Athlete of the Year winners
World Athletics Indoor Championships winners
World Athletics Championships winners
Competitors at the 2001 Goodwill Games
Goodwill Games gold medalists in athletics
21st-century American women